The 2005 Houston Texans season was the franchise's 4th season in the National Football League and the 4th and final season under head coach Dom Capers. The Texans completed the season with the worst record in franchise history (a record that would later be matched in 2013). This led to the Texans obtaining the first selection in the NFL Draft for the second time since the franchise formed in 2002. The team fired head coach Dom Capers after the season; he was replaced by Denver Broncos offensive coordinator Gary Kubiak, who would coach the team up until 2013. Their Week 3 game was postponed due to Hurricane Rita. The Texans failed to win a division game, and went 0-8 on the road for the first time in franchise history.

Offseason

NFL draft

Staff

Roster

Preseason

Regular season

Schedule

Note: Intra-division opponents are in bold text.

Game summaries

Week 1: at Bills

Week 2: vs. Pittsburgh Steelers

Week 4: at Cincinnati Bengals

Week 5: vs. Tennessee Titans

Week 6: at Seattle Seahawks

Week 7: vs. Indianapolis Colts

Week 8: vs. Cleveland Browns

Week 9: at Jacksonville Jaguars

Week 10: at Indianapolis Colts

Week 11: vs. Kansas City Chiefs

Week 12: St. Louis Rams

Week 13: at Baltimore Ravens

Week 14: at Tennessee Titans

Week 15: vs. Arizona Cardinals

Week 16: vs. Jacksonville Jaguars

Week 17: at San Francisco 49ers

Standings

Statistics

Team

Individual

Source:

References 

Houston Texans seasons
Houston